William G. Jacoby (born  1953) is a political scientist, and former professor at Michigan State University. He was editor in chief of the American Journal of Political Science until 2018 when he resigned following sexual harassment allegations. Both the University of Michigan and Michigan State later found that he had sexually harassed female graduate students, which Jacoby denied. He retired from Michigan State University on January 1, 2019.

See also
 Me Too movement

References

External links
Website at Michigan State

1950s births
Living people

Year of birth uncertain
American political scientists
University of Michigan faculty
Michigan State University faculty
Political science journal editors